The 2011 Hong Kong Sevens was a seven-a-side rugby union tournament, part of the 2010–11 IRB Sevens World Series. The competition was being held from 25–27 March in at Hong Kong Stadium in Hong Kong and featured 24 teams.

Teams 
The following teams participated:

Security 
Following an incident in 2010 when one spectator invaded the pitch, climbed onto the crossbars at the south end of the stadium before dodging back into the stands and disappearing, organisers stepped up security and announced a zero-tolerance policy of invaders in 2011. Out of concerns for safety, the local Rugby Union sent out notification that anyone entering the playing area who should not enter would be arrested by the police, instead of just being ejected from the arena.

Hong Kong Police said they received 28 reports of fans who had been victims of ticket fraud. The fans had bought the tickets from websites based in Australia, Dubai and England. The Wan Chai criminal investigation team is looking into the cases, which have been classified as "crimes outside Hong Kong." The Hong Kong Rugby Football Union confirmed that easily distinguishable bogus tickets, differing in both colour and font types, were found at the entrance to the venue. Their holders were refused entry.

Pool stage

Pool A

Pool B

Pool C

Pool D

Pool E

Pool F

Knockout stage

Shield

Bowl

Plate

Cup
New Zealand, Fiji, England and Samoa reached the semi-finals round. Fiji facing the New Zealand All Blacks, the World Series leaders and favourites 19–14 while England faced Samoa. After Fiji and Samoa were knocked out, both by 19–14, New Zealand faced England in the final.

New Zealand triumphed 29–17 over England: Frank Halai put the All Blacks ahead with a try, and Mat Turner equalised for England. By half time, New Zealand nudged 12–5 ahead after Halai scored a second try.

At the end of the tournament, New Zealand lead England by five points in the World Championship. With 105 points, England remain well clear of Fiji and Samoa, who rank third-equal on 84 points.

Statistics

Individual points

Individual tries

Women's tournament
The Cable&Wireless Worldwide Hong Kong Women's Rugby Sevens tournament, with all matches played on 25 March 2011, was won by Canada; France claimed runner-up. The Canadian team won all their matches: Playing pool matches against Japan, Chinese Taipei, and Russia, they triumphed 31–0, 64–0, and 40-7 respectively. Canada then defeated USA 26–5 to reach the finals. The French team, which had won against Hong Kong, Philippines, Netherlands and China to reach the final, lost to Canada by 28–14.

References

External links

2011
rugby union
2010–11 IRB Sevens World Series
2011 in Asian rugby union
March 2011 sports events in Asia